Tennis on Campus (TOC) is the national collegiate club tennis league operated by the United States Tennis Association (USTA). The league is played on hard courts in World TeamTennis format. 370 colleges throughout the 15 USTA geographical sections nationwide compete in the league.

The league's regular season takes place in the fall and spring along with four major tournaments, culminating with the National Championship in Orlando, Florida.

Competition format 
The regular season games are played in tournaments which are hosted by individual universities at their campus tennis facilities or a local tennis center. The matches are played in mixed gender World TeamTennis format which features four separate brackets in tournaments; copper, bronze, silver, and gold in a pool play system. Gold is the leading bracket, which is the overall champion of each tournament.

During a game, five matches are played, with a minimum of four players on a team, on hard courts.

 Men's doubles
 Women's doubles
 Men's singles
 Women's singles
 Mixed doubles

TOC players typically have an NTRP rating of 3.5 to 5.0 and played varsity high school tennis.

Major tournaments 
Outside the regular season, there are four major tournaments directly hosted by the USTA held seasonally. All four tournaments (Spring and Fall Invitationals, Sectional Championships, and the National Championship) feature free merchandise for the players, and professional photographers. The champions and runners-up of the Sectional and Invitational tournaments earn automatic bids to the National Championship.

The four major tournaments are hosted at major or professional tennis centers at rotating venues nationwide.

Sectional Championships 
The 15 USTA sections host a championship tournament where their respective sectional teams compete to win the trophy. The winners and runners-up get a bid to the National Championship.

Fall and Spring Invitationals 
The Fall and Spring Invitationals are national tournaments to which 64 schools from random sections are invited based on their seasonal record, with the winner of the tournament receiving an automatic bid to the National Championship. The tournaments are typically hosted in Surprise, Arizona and Cary, North Carolina. Due to the COVID-19 pandemic several 2020-2022 tournaments were cancelled.

Results by year:

National Championship 
The USTA Tennis on Campus National Championship is the pinnacle major tournament hosted in April at the USTA National Campus in Orlando, Florida. A pool of 64 schools throughout the nation which were the champions or runners-up of their Sectional Championship or the Fall/Spring Invitational earn automatic bids to Nationals. After the National Championship game is an awards ceremony.

The tournament lasts four days, and the matches are livestreamed on YouTube with live commentary by the USTA.

Results by year 
Below are the results of all the National Championships.

Results by school

References

External links 

Tennis in the United States
Sports organizations established in 2000
Exhibition tennis tournaments
Tennis leagues in the United States
Tennis leagues